The Master (1961–1984) is a chronological box set album looking back at American R&B/soul Marvin Gaye's 23-year recording career. Spanning four discs, the box set goes over all portions of Gaye's career with a repertoire that spanned doo-wop, R&B, soul, psychedelic soul and funk with a mixture of themes including dance songs, love ballads, duets, socially conscious material, sensual material and autobiographical revelations. The set includes rarities such as a recorded 1981 live track of Gaye and Gladys Knight & the Pips each singing their seminal hit "I Heard It Through the Grapevine", Gaye's famed 1983 performance of "The Star-Spangled Banner" at an NBA All-Star game and an a cappella performance of "The Lord's Prayer" taped during Gaye's exile in Belgium.

In 2006, Universal re-released the boxset as part of its Universal Earbook series, issuing it as an LP-sized hardback coffee table book.

Track listing

Disc one
"Stubborn Kind of Fellow"
"Pride and Joy"
"Hitch Hike"
"Wherever I Lay My Hat (That's My Home)"
"What Do You Want With Him" (Previously unreleased)
"Once Upon a Time"
"What's the Matter with You Baby" (with Mary Wells)
"Can I Get a Witness"
"Couldn't Ask for More" (Previously unreleased)
"You're Wonderful" (Previously unreleased)
"I Wonder"
"You're a Wonderful One"
"It's Got to Be Love" (previously unreleased)
"Try It Baby"
"Leavin (Previously unreleased)
"My Love for You" (Previously unreleased)
"How Sweet It Is (To Be Loved by You)"
"Baby Don't You Do It"
"Just Like a Man" (Previously unreleased alternative mix)
"Pretty Little Baby"
"Talk About a Good Feeling" (Previously unreleased)
"I'll Be Doggone"
"Little Darling (I Need You)"
"One More Heartache"
"Ain't That Peculiar"
"You're the One for Me"
"Take This Heart of Mine"
"Your Unchanging Love"

Disc two
"It Takes Two" (with Kim Weston)
"I Couldn't Help Falling for You" (Previously unreleased)
"Lonely Lover" (Previously unreleased)
"Without Your Sweet Lovin (Previously unreleased)
"Ain't No Mountain High Enough" (with Tammi Terrell)
"If I Could Build My Whole World Around You" (with Tammi Terrell)
"Your Precious Love" (with Tammi Terrell)
"If This World Were Mine" (with Tammi Terrell)
"Without You (My World Is Lonely)" (Previously unreleased)
"Together We Stand (Divided We Fall)" (Previously unreleased)
"You"
"Chained"
"I Heard It Through the Grapevine"
"You're What's Happening (In the World Today)"
"This Love Starved Heart of Mine (It's Killing Me)"
"Ain't Nothing Like the Real Thing" (with Tammi Terrell)
"Keep On Lovin' Me Honey" (with Tammi Terrell)
"You're All I Need to Get By" (with Tammi Terrell)
"Too Busy Thinking About My Baby"
"More Than a Heart Can Stand"
"How Can I Forget"
"That's the Way Love Is"
"Yesterday"
"The End of Our Road"
"Good Lovin' Ain't Easy to Come By" (with Valerie Simpson, credited to Tammi Terrell)
"What You Gave Me"

Disc three
"What's Going On"
"Save the Children"
"Mercy Mercy Me (The Ecology)"
"Inner City Blues (Make Me Wanna Holler)"
"I'm Going Home" (Previously unreleased alternative mix)
"Piece of Clay" (Previously unreleased)
"You're the Man (Pt. I & II)"
"Checking Out (Double Clutch)" (Previously unreleased)
"Trouble Man"
"Let's Get It On"
"Come Get to This"
"Just to Keep You Satisfied"
"Pledging My Love"
"My Mistake (Was to Love You)" (with Diana Ross)
"Distant Lover (Live)"
"I Want You"
"After the Dance"

Disc four
"Got to Give It Up, Pt. I"
"Here, My Dear"
"When Did You Stop Loving Me, When Did I Stop Loving You"
"Anger"
"Anna's Song"
"A Funky Space Reincarnation"
"When Did You Stop Loving Me, When Did I Stop Loving You (Reprise)"
"She Needs Me" (Previously unreleased)
"Why Did I Choose You" (Previously unreleased)
"Life Is for Learning"
"Funk Me"
"Love Me Now or Love Me Later"
"Ego Tripping Out"
"The Star-Spangled Banner" (Live)
"I Heard It Through the Grapevine" (Live) (with Gladys Knight & The Pips)
"Rockin' After Midnight"
"Sexual Healing"
"The Lord's Prayer"

References

1995 greatest hits albums
Albums produced by Norman Whitfield
Albums produced by Hal Davis
Albums produced by Harvey Fuqua
Albums produced by Smokey Robinson
Albums produced by Marvin Gaye
Albums produced by Leon Ware
Marvin Gaye compilation albums
Albums produced by Frank Wilson (musician)
Motown compilation albums
1995 albums
Albums produced by William "Mickey" Stevenson
Albums produced by Ashford & Simpson